Stanisław Krajewski (born 1950) is a Polish philosopher, mathematician and writer, activist of the Jewish minority in Poland.

Biography

He is professor of philosophy at the University of Warsaw, author, leader of the Jewish community in Poland and co-chairman of the Polish Council of Christians and Jews.

Born in Warsaw in 1950, he studied at the Faculty of Mathematics, University of Warsaw, obtained Ph.D. in mathematics at the Institute of Mathematics of the Polish Academy of Sciences, and later Habilitation degree in philosophy at the Faculty of Philosophy and Sociology of the University of Warsaw. In 2012 he was awarded the title of “professor of humanities” by the President of Poland.

Krajewski taught at the Bialystok branch of the University of Warsaw (1975 - 1981), later at the Institute of Mathematics, Polish Academy of Sciences. Since 1997 he has taught at the Institute of Philosophy of the University of Warsaw and chaired the Institute’s Scientific Council since 2012.

Krajewski was involved in dissident activities during the communist period, was member of “Solidarity” from the beginning in 1980 till 1990, the underground period included. Immediately after the fall of communism in 1989, Krajewski was among the founders of the Polish-Israeli Friendship Society as well as the Polish Council of Christians and Jews. He has been the Jewish co-chairman of the Council since its inception in 1989.

- He served on the board of the Union of Jewish Religious Communities in Poland (1997-2006)

- was the Polish consultant to the American Jewish Committee (1992-2009)

- was member of the International Council of the Auschwitz Camp Museum and Memorial (from its beginning in 1990 until 2006)

- He has also been involved in devising the post-World War II section of the core exhibition in the Warsaw Museum of the History of Polish Jews, POLIN,  opened in 2014.

Krajewski is author of publications in the field of logic and philosophy of mathematics as well as numerous books and articles on Judaism, Jewish experience and Christian-Jewish dialogue.

A recipient (jointly with his wife) of the Lifetime Achievement Award of the Taube Foundation for Jewish Life & Culture and American Jewish Committee, presented during the 23rd Jewish Culture Festival in Kraków.

Married to Monika Krajewska., they have two sons.

Books
 2018: Was ich dem interreligiösen Dialog und dem Christentum verdanke, 5-77, Co zawdzięczam dialogowi międzyreligijnemu i chrześcijaństwu, 79-141(Fundacja Judaica, Kraków).
 2017: Co zawdzięczam dialogowi międzyreligijnemu i chrześcijaństwu, 1-67, What I Owe to Interreligious Dialogue and Christianity, 71-127 (Fundacja Judaica, Kraków).
 2014: Żydzi i... (Austeria)
 2014 Czy fizyka i matematyka to nauki humanistyczne? (Do Physics and Mathematics Belong to the Humanities? with Michał Heller, in Polish, Copernicus Center Press)
 2011: Czy matematyka jest nauką humanistyczną? (Does Mathematics Belong to the Humanities?, in Polish, Copernicus Center Press)
 2010: Nasza żydowskość (Our Jewishness, in Polish, Austeria)
 2007: Tajemnica Izraela a tajemnica Kościoła (The Mystery of Israel and the Mystery of the Church, in Polish, Biblioteka "Więzi")
 2005: Poland and the Jews: reflections of a Polish Polish Jew (in English, Austeria)
 2004: 54 komentarze do Tory dla nawet najmniej religijnych spośród nas (54 Commentaries on the Torah for Even the Least Religious Among Us, in Polish, Austeria)
 2003: Twierdzenie Gödla i jego interpretacje filozoficzne: od mechanicyzmu do postmodernizmu (Goedel’s Theorem and Its Philosophical Interpretations: from Mechanism to Post-Modernism, in Polish, Wyd. Instytutu Filozofii i Socjologii PAN)
 1997: Żydzi, judaizm, Polska (Jews, Judaism, Poland, in Polish, Vocatio)

Co-editor of
 Studies in Logic, Grammar and Rhetoric 44 (57), 2016, Theology in Mathematics?(ed. by Stanisław Krajewski and Kazimierz Trzęsicki); 
 Studies in Logic, Grammar and Rhetoric 27 (40), Papers on Logic and Rationality: Festschrift in Honour of Andrzej Grzegorczyk (2012, in English, Bialystok: Univ. of Bialystok);
 Abraham Joshua Heschel: Philosophy, Theology and Interreligious Dialogue (2009, in English, Wiesbaden: Harrassowitz Verlag).
 Common Rejoicing in the Torah (2008, in Polish),
 Topics in Logic, Philosophy and Foundations of Mathematics and Computer Science. In Recognition of Professor Andrzej Grzegorczyk (2007, in English, Amsterdam: IOS),

References

External links
 http://spispracownikow.uw.edu.pl/index2.php?szukaj=startp
 http://www.woolf.cam.ac.uk/uploads/krajeski.pdf
 https://uw.academia.edu/StanislawKrajewski/Papers

1950 births
21st-century Polish philosophers
Living people
Jewish philosophers
Polish mathematicians